The 2000 NCAA Division I Men's Golf Championships were contested at the 62nd annual NCAA-sanctioned golf tournament for determining the individual and team national champions of men's collegiate golf at the Division I level in the United States.

The tournament was held at the Grand National in Opelika, Alabama.

Oklahoma State won the team championship, the Cowboys' ninth NCAA title and first since 1995. Oklahoma State defeated Georgia Tech in a play-off after the two teams finished tied atop the team standings.

Charles Howell III, also from Oklahoma State, won the individual title.

Qualifying
The NCAA held three regional qualifying tournaments, with the top ten teams from each event qualifying for the national championship.

Individual results

Individual champion
 Charles Howell III, Oklahoma State (265)

Team results

Finalists

Eliminated after 36 holes

DC = Defending champions
Debut appearance

References

NCAA Men's Golf Championship
Golf in Alabama
NCAA Golf Championship
NCAA Golf Championship
NCAA Golf Championship